Princess Clotilde Marie Pascale of Savoy (née Clotilde Marie Pascale Courau) (born 3 April 1969) is a French actress. She is married to Emanuele Filiberto di Savoia, a member of the House of Savoy and the grandson of Umberto II, the last king of Italy.

Family

Clotilde Marie Pascale Courau
was born on 3 April 1969 in Levallois-Perret, Hauts-de-Seine, France, the daughter of Jean-Claude Courau (b. 1942) and French noblewoman Catherine Marie Antoinette du Pontavice des Renardières (b. 1948), daughter of Count Pierre Francoise Marie Antoine du Pontavice des Renardières (b. 1926), whose family can be traced back to 13th century. She has three sisters named Christine, Camille, and Capucine Courau. The sisters were brought up in the Roman Catholic religion.

Acting career
In 1991, Courau was nominated for a César, for Most Promising Actress (Meilleur espoir féminin), and won a European Film Award for Best Actress, both for the film Le petit criminel (1990). She then appeared in Dusty Hughes' A Slip of the Tongue opposite John Malkovich on the stage, and in Vincent Ward's Map of the Human Heart. In 1995, she won the Prix Suzanne Bianchetti at the SACD Awards. She was nominated again for a César twice in 1996 for Best Supporting Actress (Meilleur second rôle féminin) and Most Promising Actress (Meilleur espoir féminin) both for the film Élisa. In 1998 she was named as one of European cinema's "Shooting Stars" by European Film Promotion and in 2000 she won the Prix Romy Schneider. She was also created a Dame of the Ordre des Arts et des Lettres of France on 7 February 2007.

She had a featured role in Deterrence, an American film about nuclear war that marked the directing debut of Rod Lurie.

Marriage
Clotilde Courau announced her engagement on 10 July, and on 25 September 2003 at the Church of Santa Maria degli Angeli e dei Martiri in Rome, she married Emanuele Filiberto, Prince of Venice. At the ceremony she wore a wedding gown designed by Valentino. Six months pregnant at the time of the wedding, she was seen as a controversial bride because of her left-wing views.

The couple have two daughters: 
 Princess Vittoria Chiara Cristina Adelaide Maria (born 28 December 2003 in Geneva, Switzerland),
 Princess Luisa Giovanna Bianca Agata Gavina Maria (born 16 August 2006 in Geneva, Switzerland).

Rose
In 2009, her name was given to a rose created by the rose grower Fabien Ducher to mark the 500,000th visitor to the Jardins de l'Imaginaire, Terrasson.

Filmography
 Civilisations (1988) (TV mini-series) – Elyssa
 Le petit criminel – (1990) – The sister, Nathalie (Stéphanie)
  – (1993) – Alina Suchecka
 Map of the Human Heart – (1993) – Rainee
 The Pickle – (1993) – Françoise
 Ugly Meets the People – (1995) – Girl
 Tom est tout seul – (1995) – Marion
 Élisa – (1995) – Solange
 La fidèle infidèle (1995) (TV) – Cécile
 L'Appât – (1995) – Patricia
 Les Grands Ducs – (1996) – Juliette
 Une leçon particulière (1997) (TV) – Julie
 Fred – (1997) – Lisa
 Marthe – (1997) – Marthe
 Bob le magnifique (1998) (TV) – Christine / Christina
 Hors jeu – (1998) – Clotilde Courau
 Le poulpe – (1998) – Cheryl
 Milk (1999) – Ilaria
 Deterrence (1999) – Katie
 En face – (2000) – Michelle
 La parenthèse enchantée – (2000) – Alice
 Promenons-nous dans les bois – (2000) – Sophie
 Exit – (2000) – Pearl / The journalist
 Le nouveau Jean-Claude – (2002) – Marianna
 Embrassez qui vous voudrez – (2002) – Julie
 Un monde presque paisible – (2002) – Simone
 The Code – (2002) – Nina
 Mon Idole – (2002) – Fabienne
 Les beaux jours (2003) (TV) – Gaby
 Nuit noire, 17 octobre 1961 (2005) (TV) – Sabine
 La signora delle camelie (2005) (TV) – ....
 Mafalda di Savoia (2006) (TV mini-series) – Giovanna di Savoia
 La Vie en Rose (2007) – Annetta Gassion
 Modern Love (2008) – Marie
 Chez Maupassant (1 episode, 2008, TV episode La chambre 11) – Clarisse / Marguerite
 Des mots d'amour aka Words of Love (Canada, English title) (2009) (TV) – Alice Andrézy
 Tous les soleils (2011) – Florence
 Babysitting (2014) – Mme. Schaudel
 L'Ombre des femmes (2015) – Manon
 Eva & Leon (2015) – Lucie
 Le ciel attendra (2016) – Sylvie
 An Easy Girl (2019)
 The Bad Poet (2020)
 Benedetta (2021)

Honours

National honours

 : Member of the Order of Arts and Letters, 3rd Class

Dynastic honour

 Montenegrin Royal Family: Dame Grand Cross of the Order of Prince Danilo I
 House of Savoy: Dame Grand Cordon of the Royal Order of Saints Maurice and Lazarus

References

External links

1969 births
Living people
European Film Award for Best Actress winners
People from Levallois-Perret
Italian princesses
French film actresses
Princesses of Savoy
Princesses by marriage
Royalty and nobility actors
French television actresses
20th-century French actresses
21st-century French actresses
Chevaliers of the Ordre des Arts et des Lettres
Cours Florent alumni